USS Arapahoe was a proposed United States Navy screw sloop-of-war or steam frigate that was cancelled in 1866 without being completed.

Arapahoe was a wooden-hulled, bark-rigged (or ship-rigged) Contoocook-class screw sloop-of-war or steam frigate with a single funnel slated to be built for the Union Navy late in the American Civil War. Because of the collapse of the Confederate States of America in 1865, plans for her construction were cancelled in 1866.

References 
Notes

Bibliography
 
 

 

American Civil War ships of the United States
Sloops of the United States Navy
Cancelled ships of the United States Navy